Camden Haven River, an open and trained intermediate wave dominated barrier estuary, is located in the Mid North Coast region of New South Wales, Australia.

Course and features
Camden Haven River upper catchment starts at the two south eastern creeks at Edge.   The merged flow of the two rivers, together with the outflow of Queens Lake spills into the Tasman Sea of the South Pacific Ocean. The river descends  over its  course.

Camden Haven River is transversed by the Pacific Highway north of the village of Rossglen, between Coopernook and Kew.

See also

 Rivers of New South Wales
 List of rivers of Australia

References

External links
 
 Northern Rivers Geology Blog – Camden Haven River

 

Rivers of New South Wales
Mid North Coast